Zippy Chippy (April 20, 1991 – April 2022) was a thoroughbred race horse, a bay gelding, who is notable for being winless in 100 races. Zippy Chippy's pedigree includes many famous horses, such as Ben Brush, Buckpasser, Busanda, Bold Ruler,  Count Fleet, Man o' War, Nasrullah, Native Dancer, Northern Dancer, Round Table, Tom Fool, War Admiral, and the greatest "blue hen" broodmare of the twentieth century, La Troienne.

Career
Zippy Chippy was owned and trained by Felix Monserrate at Capritaur Farm in New York. Tom Gilcoyne, a retired historian for the National Museum of Racing and Hall of Fame in Saratoga Springs, New York, said that Zippy Chippy "...hasn't done anything to harm the sport. But it's a little bit like looking at the recorded performances of all horse races through the wrong end of the telescope."

Felix Monserrate (d. 2015), who had boarded Zippy Chippy, acquired the horse in 1995, in a trade for a 1988 Ford truck. The horse was not always cooperative at races, and was eventually banned from competing at a number of tracks for such antics as "refusing to break from the starting gate". He was also known to bite people and pick people up "by their collars and not letting them down". According to Monserrate, "This horse is mean. ... He's been mean all his life."

In 2000, the magazine People included Zippy Chippy on its list of that year's most interesting personalities.

In August 2001, Zippy came in first against a minor league baseball player in a  race. (Although there are sources that say he lost this 40-yard dash, it seems there may have been two races. On August 18, 2000, Rochester outfielder José Herrera outran Zippy Chippy in a 40-yard race.) Zippy also won against a harness racer called Paddy's Laddy in a publicity stunt in which he spotted the trotter a twenty-length lead.

Zippy Chippy's 100th loss occurred on September 10, 2004, in the Northampton Fair at the Three County Fairgrounds. He went off at odds of 7-2, making him the second betting choice; however, Zippy Chippy finished last. In December 2004, he retired from racing to become an outrider pony at his hometown track, Finger Lakes racetrack in Farmington, New York, where he'd been banned from racing on September 8, 1998, after failing to leave the gate with the rest of the field for the third consecutive time. As an outrider pony, he escorted horses in the post parade and led them to the gate.
Other horses with similarly long losing streaks include Dance Saber (0 wins for 229 starts, Japan), Meine Attrice (0 wins for 192 starts, Japan), Dona Chepa (0 for 135, Puerto Rico), Quixall Crossett (0 for 103, Britain), Costano Mille (0 for 123, Australia), Ouroene (0 for 124, Australia), and Haru Urara (0 for 113, Japan).

Zippy Chippy's lifetime record is: 100 starts, 0 wins, and lifetime earnings of $30,834; he also had eight second-place and 12 third-place finishes.

Retirement
Zippy Chippy retired to the Bobby Frankel Division of Old Friends Thoroughbred Retirement Farm at Cabin Creek near Saratoga Race Course in New York on April 22, 2010. The 19-year-old gelding joined Cabin Creek's seven other retirees and lived out his life there.

Zippy Chippy went on tour in Kentucky in the summer of 2012 to bring attention to the safe retirement of race horses.  Zippy-themed merchandises were also sold to raise funds to support the retirement of race horses at the farm. 

At the age of 30, Zippy Chippy was featured in the 2020 children's picture book, The True Story of Zippy Chippy: The Little Horse That Couldn't. He was previously featured in the 2016 book The Legend of Zippy Chippy: Life Lessons from Horse Racing’s Most Lovable Loser.

Zippy Chippy's death was announced by Old Friends farm on April 16, 2022; he was officially 31 years old (by horse racing standards, all horses turn a year older on January 1).

Race record

Adaptations
 

 Bennett, Artie (February 25, 2020). The True Story of Zippy Chippy: The Little Horse That Couldn't. Illustrated by Dave Szalay. NorthSouth Books. . (children's picture-book biography).

Pedigree 

Zippy Chippy was inbred 3 × 3 to Buckpasser, meaning that Buckpasser appeared twice in the third generation of his pedigree. He was also inbred 4 × 4 to Native Dancer.

See also 
 Underdog
 Haru Urara, a similarly unsuccessful, but popular Japanese racehorse.
 List of historical horses

References

External links
Zippy Chippy in The Encyclopedia of New York State

Notes 

1991 racehorse births
2022 racehorse deaths
Racehorses bred in New York (state)
Racehorses trained in the United States
Old Friends Equine Retirement
Thoroughbred family 23-b